Elisha Franklin Paxton (March 4, 1828 – May 3, 1863) was an American lawyer and soldier who served as a Confederate brigadier general during the American Civil War. He died while leading the “Stonewall Brigade“ during the Battle of Chancellorsville.

Early life and career
Paxton was born in Rockbridge County, Virginia of English and Scots-Irish descent. He was the son of Margaret (McNutt) and Elisha Paxton, a Presbyterian family, and his grandfather was American Revolutionary War veteran William Paxton. His first education came from his cousin James H. Paxton's school.

In 1845 he attended Washington College in Lexington, Virginia, and in 1847 he entered Yale University located in New Haven, Connecticut. Paxton then attended the University of Virginia Law School in Charlottesville in 1849, graduating at the top of his class. When fully grown Paxton was described as "five feet ten inches high, heavily built and of great bodily strength", a physique that inspired his childhood nickname, "Bull.” He was known not to drink alcohol.

Upon graduating Paxton settled in Virginia and became a lawyer, then a bank president in Lexington. He also later worked as a planter, and then moved to Ohio. After passing the state's bar examination, he worked for several years in Ohio prosecuting land claims. His law practice ended in 1860 because of his failing eyesight, but this did not stop him from becoming prominent in political matters. His son Matthew wrote that "he was a man of ardent temperament and strong convictions such as did not permit him to remain an indifferent spectator of the exciting political occurrences of era." His "blunt and outspoken views" on behalf of the secession of South Carolina caused a rift in his friendship with Lexington resident Thomas J. Jackson; the two men did not speak to each other until after each had joined the Confederate Army.

When he was 26, Paxton married 23-year-old Elizabeth Hannah White (died February 16, 1872) on November 2, 1854. She was the daughter of Matthew White and lived in Lexington. They would have four children together, three of whom out-lived Paxton: Matthew W. Paxton, John G. Paxton, and Frank Paxton. The actor Bill Paxton was a direct descendant of Elisha Paxton (great-great-grandson) and his son John Gallatin Paxton. Matthew became the editor of the newspaper Rockbridge County News and John a lawyer in Kansas City, Missouri. Frank lived in San Saba County, Texas.

Civil War service
At the start of the American Civil War in 1861, Paxton chose to follow his home state and the Confederate cause. Despite a lack of any military training, Paxton entered the Confederate Army on April 18 as a first lieutenant of the Rockbridge Rifles, part of Col. James F. Preston's 4th Virginia Infantry Regiment.

The 4th Virginia fought on July 21 during the First Battle of Bull Run (First Manassas) in Brig. Gen. Thomas J. Jackson's First Brigade of the Army of the Shenandoah, soon to be known as the Stonewall Brigade. Paxton was wounded in an arm during this battle and his actions won him praise from his comrades. After recovering, Paxton was elected major of the 27th Virginia Infantry on October 14, 1861, but was not re-elected to the position the following spring because of his "heavy-handedness and a lack of tact". On May 30, 1862, Paxton was appointed aide-de-camp to Jackson's staff, and participated in the Valley Campaign of the Shenandoah Valley and the Seven Days Battles, both in Virginia.

By August 4, 1862, Paxton was made Jackson's assistant quartermaster, and fought in the Northern Virginia Campaign. Paxton was appointed assistant adjutant general (chief of staff) on Jackson's staff on August 15, and took part in the Second Battle of Bull Run on August 28–30, and then in the Maryland Campaign and the Battle of Antietam on September 17.

Stonewall Brigade
Col. Andrew J. Grigsby took over the Stonewall Brigade when its commander Col. William Baylor was killed at Second Bull Run. At Antietam, the loss of Brig. Gen John R. Jones and Brig. Gen William Starke left Grigsby in charge of an entire division, two command levels above his rank. Despite this, Jackson refused to give him permanent command of anything above regimental level. On November 1, 1862, Paxton was promoted from major to brigadier general and assigned command of the Stonewall Brigade. It was a move that did not sit well with the men he passed over, officers with more experience as well as seniority. Paxton was the choice of Jackson and the posting was made directly by Confederate President Jefferson Davis. Although Jackson rarely deviated from protocol for promotions, his justification for selecting Paxton was that none of the subordinate commanders in the Stonewall Brigade was the "best qualified" for the position because "I did not regard any of them as competent as another." Paxton assumed command of the brigade on November 15. Grigsby was "as mad as thunder" and resigned his commission in protest.

During the Battle of Fredericksburg on December 13, Paxton and his brigade in the division of Brig. Gen. William B. Taliaferro were on the right of the Confederate defense when Union Maj. Gen. George G. Meade's division made a brief (and unsupported) successful attack, but Paxton's men counterattacked and drove the Federals off. Fredericksburg campaign historian Frank O'Reilly criticized Paxton's performance during the engagement, judging that:

Chancellorsville and death

By the spring of 1863, Bull Paxton, who a member of his staff described as a "rather profane and godless man" found new solace in religion, possibly because of his association with the religious Stonewall Jackson. He started carrying a pocket Bible and on the night before the Battle of Chancellorsville, he admitted a premonition of his death and prepared himself for it. On the second day of battle, the brigade was part of Jackson's audacious flanking movement around Union Maj. Gen. Joseph Hooker's army. Paxton and his brigade were stationed to guard Germanna Junction on May 2, and that night his men were ordered to the front line.

After Jackson was wounded, command of the Second Corps went briefly to Maj. Gen. A.P. Hill, but when he too was hit, cavalry commander Maj. Gen. J.E.B. Stuart was given command. On May 3 Paxton led his men through densely wooded terrain towards the Union position. He was on foot at the head of his brigade when he was shot through his chest, killing him within an hour. Lt. Randolph Barton of Paxton's staff wrote that Paxton fell only two feet away from him. "I placed my arm under him, when he muttered, 'Tie up my arm', and died. He was not shot in the arm, but through the heart." Later that day army commander Gen. Robert E. Lee sent a wire to the authorities in the Confederate capitol of Richmond, saying:

Paxton was initially buried at Guinea Station, Virginia, a short distance from where Jackson lay dying. He was later brought back to Lexington and was re-buried there at Oak Grove Cemetery, within a few feet of his former commander.

See also

 List of American Civil War generals (Confederate)

Notes

References
 Eicher, John H., and David J. Eicher, Civil War High Commands. Stanford: Stanford University Press, 2001. 
 O'Reilly, Francis Augustín. The Fredericksburg Campaign: Winter War on the Rappahannock. Baton Rouge: Louisiana State University Press, 2003. .
 Robertson, James I., Jr., Stonewall Jackson: The Man, The Soldier, The Legend, MacMillan Publishing, 1997, .
 Sears, Stephen W. Chancellorsville. Boston: Houghton Mifflin, 1996. .
 Sifakis, Stewart. Who Was Who in the Civil War. New York: Facts On File, 1988. .
 Warner, Ezra J. Generals in Gray: Lives of the Confederate Commanders. Baton Rouge: Louisiana State University Press, 1959. .
 Wright, Marcus J., General Officers of the Confederate Army: Officers of the Executive Departments of the Confederate States, Members of the Confederate Congress by States. Mattituck, NY: J. M. Carroll & Co., 1983. . First published 1911 by Neale Publishing Co.
 aotw.org  Antietam on the web biography of Paxton.
 stonewall.hut.ru Stonewall Hut biography of Paxton.
 genealogy.rootsweb.ancestry.com Paxton Family tree descriptions.
 docsouth.unc.edu Paxton's Civil War orders and correspondence.

Further reading
 Morton, Oren F., A History of Rockbridge County, Virginia, McClure Co., 1920.

External links
Memoir and Memorials: Elisha Franklin Paxton, Brigadier-General, C.S.A.; Composed of his Letters from Camp and Field While an Officer in the Confederate Army, with an Introductory and Connecting Narrative Collected and Arranged by his Son, John Gallatin Paxton. New York: The Neale Publishing Co., 1907.
 www.hmdb.org Paxton's marker stone at Chancellorsville
 Paxton's grave at Find-a-Grave.

Confederate States Army brigadier generals
People of Virginia in the American Civil War
Stonewall Brigade
American people of English descent
American people of Scotch-Irish descent
People from Rockbridge County, Virginia
Yale University alumni
Washington and Lee University alumni
University of Virginia School of Law alumni
Ohio lawyers
Virginia lawyers
Confederate States of America military personnel killed in the American Civil War
1828 births
1863 deaths